Koepcke's hermit (Phaethornis koepckeae) is a species of hummingbird in the family Trochilidae. It is endemic to Peru.

Taxonomy and systematics

Koepcke's hermit is monotypic. It and the needle-billed hermit (P. philippii) are sister species and may form a superspecies.

Description

Males weigh  and females . It is one of the few hermit hummingbirds with a nearly straight bill. It has a blackish crown glossed with greenish, a glossy greenish bronze nape, a glossy bronze back, and a rufous rump. The tail is mostly dark glossy green. The innermost pair of tail feathers are longer than the others and have white tips; the others have broad buffy rufous tips. The face has a black "mask" bordered with narrow white streaks. The chin and throat are white, the center of the breast pale reddish buff with grayer sides, and the belly and flanks a rich reddish buff.

Distribution and habitat

Koepcke's hermit is found on the eastern foothills of the Peruvian Andes from just south of the Marañón River in Amazonas south to central Madre de Dios. It inhabits the understory of tall evergreen forest and humid montane forest. It generally shuns secondary forest.

Behavior

Feeding

Koepcke's hermit is assumed to be a "trap-line" feeder like other hermit hummingbirds, visiting a circuit of a wide variety of flowering plants for nectar. It also consumes small arthropods.

Breeding

The breeding season of Koepcke's hermit has not been defined. It builds a conical nest suspended from the underside of the tip of a drooping leaf.

Vocalization

Koepcke's hermit's song is "a ringing, buzzy series of short notes: b'zee b'zee b'zee" Its calls include "a ringing, rising tchwee or tchwing and "a descending, accelerating series of high notes".

Status

The IUCN has assessed Koepcke's hermit as Near Threatened. Its population is estimated to be between 6,000 and 15,000 mature individuals and decreasing. "It is threatened by rapid deforestation within its elevational range."

References

Koepcke's hermit
Birds of the Peruvian Andes
Endemic birds of Peru
Koepcke's hermit
Koepcke's hermit
Koepcke's hermit
Taxonomy articles created by Polbot